Wochenblick (Week-review) war an Austrian newspaper. Started as a regional weekly for Upper Austria, the online-version gained attention in the right-wing community of Austria and Germany. The newspaper is close to the Austrian Freedom-Party (FPÖ) and serves the "right boulevard". The content is disproportionatel and often identified as factually incorrect.

In December 2022, Wochenblick announced that it would cease reporting for financial reasons.

History 
Wochenblick was founded in March 2016. Media owner (publisher) and manufacturer is Medien24 GmbH based in Brunnenthal. Emotion Media GmbH is the 100% shareholder. The first editor-in-chief was Kurt Guggenbichler, which had worked for 25 years for Oberösterreichischen Nachrichten. Christian Seibert replaced him on May 4, 2018. The position he held until March 2020. The than editor-in-chief is Elsa Mittmannsgruber announced in late January 2022 to fully switch to "Auf1" YouTube-TV. Her Succeder is Berandette Conrads. Managing Director is Norbert Geroldinger. In the first few weeks, the newspaper was distributed free of charge on the streets in Linz and Wels, both in Upper Austria.

Tendentious content and opinion making 
Wochenblicks header are often following a right-wing polulistic schemata. In the year of 2017 German federal election Wochenblick titled "Merkel is hoping for 12 millions immigrants". Than chancellor Angela Merkel never said this; it was completely false.

The weekly is spreading hoax about the COVID pandemic and is popular at the anti-vax movement ("Corona dictatorship: the horror continues").

The editor in-chief Elsa Mittmannsgruber also appears on the right-wing YouTube TV Station AUF1, which is owned by Stefan Magnet, with his own show.

References

Wochenblick
2016 establishments in Austria
German-language newspapers
Weekly newspapers published in Austria
Media of Neue Rechte